Fort Edgecomb, built in 1808–1809, is a two-story octagonal wooden blockhouse with restored fortifications located on Davis Island in the town of Edgecomb, Lincoln County, Maine, United States. It is the centerpiece of the Fort Edgecomb State Historic Site. It was added to the National Register of Historic Places in 1969, with its boundaries increased to create a historic district in 1991.

Description
Fort Edgecomb is located on Davis Island, actually a peninsula jutting into the Sheepscot River across from the village center of Wiscasset. Davis Island is separated from the mainland by a short neck, and Fort Edgecomb is located at the island's southern end. The ground floor walls have loopholes through which muskets could be fired, while the upper level had portholes for firing cannons. Although the blockhouse is the most visible feature, the fort's main armament was a water battery to defend the river. This battery originally had five cannons, including a 50-pounder columbiad and four 18-pounder smoothbore cannons. Each cannon was in its own bastion, with the bastions arranged in three tiers. The blockhouse also had two carronades, which were a relatively short cannon of large bore.

History
The fort was built as part of the second system of US fortifications, guarding the then-important port of Wiscasset, then one of the largest shipbuilding centers in New England. A war scare with the British over US trade with France during the Napoleonic Wars sparked the building of these forts, along with Thomas Jefferson's Embargo Act of 1807, which closed US ports and vessels to foreign trade. The fort's construction was supervised by US Army engineer Moses Porter, later commander of the Regiment of Light Artillery. Although the fort was built for defense, its first use (as with most of Maine's second system forts) was to enforce the embargo. This embargo was not popular with Maine's merchants, and it is said that one of two times Fort Edgecomb's cannon were fired was in salute at James Madison's inauguration on 4 March 1809 (or, less tactfully, to celebrate his lifting of Jefferson's embargo). Eventually the War of 1812 broke out. The cannons were also fired on 14 February 1815, when word was received of peace with the British.

During the War of 1812, this post saw considerable activity, holding British prisoners of war, many of them brought to Wiscasset harbor by American privateers. In 1814, Fort Edgecomb became an important base in defending against a possible British attack on mid-coast Maine. It remained manned until 1818, and was reactivated during the Civil War.

The Friends of Fort Edgecomb celebrated its bicentennial on 13 June 2009, on the grounds of the fort.

See also
National Register of Historic Places listings in Lincoln County, Maine

References

External links

Fort Edgecomb State Historic Site Department of Agriculture, Conservation and Forestry
 Edgecomb Historical Society / Friends of Fort Edgecomb official site
 Fort Edgecomb at FortWiki.com

Further reading
 
Smith, Joshua M. Blockhouse & Battery: A History of Fort Edgecomb (Edgecomb, ME: Friends of Fort Edgecomb, 2009)
Smith, Joshua M. Borderland Smuggling (University Press of Florida, 2006)
Smith, Joshua M. "Maine's Embargo Forts," Maine History, Vol. 44, No. 2 (April 2009), 143-154.
 

Edgecomb
Edgecomb
Octagonal buildings in the United States
Pre-statehood history of Maine
Maine state historic sites
Tourist attractions in Lincoln County, Maine
Historic districts on the National Register of Historic Places in Maine
National Register of Historic Places in Lincoln County, Maine
Military installations established in 1808
1808 establishments in Maine